Winston-Salem Tobacco Historic District is a national historic district located at Winston-Salem, Forsyth County, North Carolina.  The district encompasses 16 contributing buildings and 16 contributing structures in a predominantly industrial section of Winston-Salem.  The buildings date from about 1890 to 1959, and include buildings relating to the tobacco industry, specifically R. J. Reynolds Tobacco Company.  Also on the district are a once-thriving African American and the wholesale commercial business district that once catered to the R. J. Reynolds Tobacco Company workers. Located in the district is the separately listed Romanesque Revival style S. J. Nissen Building and Piedmont Leaf Tobacco Company.

It was listed on the National Register of Historic Places in 2009.

References

Tobacco buildings in the United States
Historic districts on the National Register of Historic Places in North Carolina
Romanesque Revival architecture in North Carolina
Second Empire architecture in North Carolina
Buildings and structures in Winston-Salem, North Carolina
National Register of Historic Places in Winston-Salem, North Carolina